The Grove at Shrewsbury is an upscale lifestyle center located on Route 35 in Shrewsbury, New Jersey,  south of downtown Red Bank. A lifestyle center is a shopping center or mixed-used commercial development that combines the traditional retail functions of a shopping mall but with leisure amenities oriented towards upscale consumers. The Grove at Shrewsbury was developed and is managed by Metrovation.

The center contains 40 stores and is anchored by Brooks Brothers, Anthropologie, Williams Sonoma, J. Crew and Banana Republic.

History
The Grove at Shrewsbury, New Jersey's first lifestyle center, opened in March 1989. The first major store was Epstein's. By August, 37 of the 40 units were occupied. Epstein's would later close and Sealfon's, another upscale, regional New Jersey department store opened in its place in 1994.  That store also went out of business.  The space was eventually subdivided and in its place opened a flagship Brooks Brothers and Anthropologie, Monmouth County's first.

Peloton opened a store in 2021.

Victoria's Secret and Pink closed in 2020.
Frutta Bowls is closing.
Eddie Bauer closed in January 2019.

References

External links

 "Properties managed", Metrovation

Buildings and structures in Monmouth County, New Jersey
Shopping malls in New Jersey
Shopping malls established in 1988
Tourist attractions in Monmouth County, New Jersey
Shopping malls in the New York metropolitan area
Shrewsbury, New Jersey